The surujin or suruchin is  one of the traditional weapons of Okinawan Kobudo.  It comprises a 2–3 metre long rope with a weight tied to each end. Historically this weapon is very prevalent and can be found attached to a weapon or used separately. It is a weapon designed for warfare.

In more recent times, specifically the end of the 19th century and early part of the 20th century, the surujin appeared as a weighted lightweight chain varying in length between 2 and 3 metres in length. At one end was a weight and the other a metal spike.  The weight was used to throw at an opponent or to ensnare a weapon and the length of chain was then either pulled to unbalance the enemy or used to entwine them using techniques similar to that of hojojutsu. The spike was then employed to disable or administer a coup de grâce. It belongs to the broad class of chain weapons.

These are quite similar to the ninjutsu manriki.

See also
Bolas
Kusari-fundo
Meteor hammer

References

External links
http://www.okinawanweapons.com/suruchin.html

Ancient weapons
Chain and rope throwing weapons
Non-lethal weapons
Primitive weapons
Weapons of Okinawa